Gustav Höög (born 11 April 1995) is a Swedish former road cyclist.

Major results

2013
 1st  Road race, National Junior Road Championships
 9th Paris–Roubaix Juniors
2014
 5th Road race, National Road Championships
 7th Skive–Løbet
2015
 2nd Road race, National Under-23 Road Championships
 3rd Overall Tour of Estonia
 3rd Overall Baltic Chain Tour
1st Young rider classification
 5th GP Viborg
2018
 1st Memorial Van Coningsloo
 1st Kalmar Grand Prix
 3rd Road race, National Road Championships
 9th Heistse Pijl

References

External links

1995 births
Living people
Swedish male cyclists
20th-century Swedish people
21st-century Swedish people